(Main list of acronyms)


 y – (s) Yocto-
 Y – (s) Yotta – Yttrium

Y0–9 
 Y2K – (i) Year Two Thousand

YA 
 yA – (s) Yoctoampere
 Ya – (s) Yottayear
 YA
(s) Yottaampere
(i) Young Adult
 YAC – (a/i) Youth-Adult Committee
 YAFLA – (a) Yet Another Five Letter Abbreviation
 YAP – (a) Young Aspiring Professional
 YaBPr – (a) Yet another Brother Pat rant
 YABSLAG – (a) Yet another boy singing like a girl

YB 
 Yb – (s) Ytterbium
 YB – (i) Youcef Benzouada (Southern Algerian name)

YC 
 yC – (s) Yoctocoulomb
 YC – (s) Yottacoulomb

YD 
 YD – (s) People's Democratic Republic of Yemen (ISO 3166 digram, obsolete 1990)
 YDS – (i) Yosemite Decimal System (climbing)

YE 
 YE – (s) Yemen (ISO 3166 digram)
 YEM – (s) Yemen (ISO 3166 trigram) – Manitowaning/Manitoulin East Municipal Airport IATA airport code
 YER – (s) Yemeni rial (ISO 4217 currency code)

YF 
 yF – (s) Yoctofarad
 YF – (s) Yottafarad

YG 
 yg – (s) Yoctogram
 Yg – (s) Yottagram
 YGM – You've got mail
 Ygo – (i) Yu-Gi-Oh!
 YGCO – (i) Yamaneko Group of Comet Observers

YH 
 yH – (s) Yoctohenry
 YH – (s) Yottahenry
  YHS – Ya Hoor sur!
 YHBT – (i) You Have Been Trolled
 YHIH1 – (a) You Heard It Here First (lowercase: yhih1, pronounced yi-hi)
 YHII – You Have It Inside

YI 
 yi – (s) Yiddish language (ISO 639-1 code)
 Yi – (s) Yobi
 YI – (s) Serbia and Montenegro (deprecated FIPS 10-4 country code, now RB (Serbia) and MJ (Montenegro))
 yid – (s) Yiddish language (ISO 639-2 code)
 YIH - (a)  Yiff In Hell
 YILP - (a) Youth Integration Livelihood Improvement Project
 Yippie – (p) Youth International Party + suffix

YJ 
 yJ – (s) Yoctojoule
 YJ – (s) Yottajoule

YK 
 yK – (s) Yoctokelvin
 YK – (s) Yottakelvin
 YKYFCW – You know you're from Christchurch when (post-earthquake joke)

YL 
 yL – (s) Yoctolitre
 YL – (s) Yottalitre

YM 
 ym – (s) Yoctometre
 Ym – (s) Yottametre
 YM – (s) Yemen (FIPS 10-4 country code) – (i) Your Magazine (originally Young Miss, later Young & Modern)
 YMCA – (i) Young Men's Christian Association
 YMD – (s) People's Democratic Republic of Yemen (ISO 3166 trigram, obsolete 1990)
 YMMD – (i) You Make My Day
 YMMV – (i) Your Mileage May Vary (adapted from the EPA's automobile mileage estimates, where it is used to convey the original meaning, "results may vary"); but (now) when used as an idiom, it -- (either the acronym "YMMV" or the 4 words) -- can instead mean (this e.g. comes from wikt:your mileage may vary#Phrase:) "this is just my opinion, your opinion may be different".

YN 
 yN – (s) Yoctonewton
 YN – (s) Yottanewton
 YNWA - reference to Liverpool F.C.'s sports anthem, the 1945 show tune You'll Never Walk Alone

YO 
 yo – (s) Yoruba language (ISO 639-1 code)
 YO – (s) former Yugoslavia (NATO country code, obsolete 1993)
 YOLO – (a) You Only Live Once
 yor – (s) Yoruba language (ISO 639-2 code)

YP 
 YPA – (i) Yards per Pass Attempt (football statistic)
 YPG – (i) Yekîneyên Parastina Gel (Kurdish, "People's Protection Units" or "People's Defense Units")
 YPIO – (a) Your Problem Is Obvious
 YPO – (a) Young Presidents' Organization

YR 
 YRR – (i) "Young, Restless, and Reformed", an alternative name for the New Calvinist movement

YS 
 ys – (s) Yoctosecond
 yS – (s) Yoctosiemens
 Ys – (s) Yottasecond
 YS – (s) Yottasiemens
 YSA
 (i) Young Single Adult, a designation used by the LDS Church for single adults under 30
 Young Socialist Alliance
 Youth Service America

YT 
 yT – (s) Yoctotesla
 YT
(s) Mayotte (ISO 3166 digram)
Yottatesla
Yukon Territory (postal symbol)
 YTD – (i) Year-To-Date
 YTM – (i) Yield to Maturity
 YTS – (i) Youth Training Scheme
 YTT – Yoshi Topsy-Turvy
YT - YouTube

YU 
 YU
(i) York University
(s) former Yugoslavia (ISO 3166 digram, obsolete 2003)
 YUG – (s) former Yugoslavia (ISO 3166 trigram, obsolete 2003)
 Yuppie – (p) Young Urban Professional + suffix

YV 
 yV – (s) Yoctovolt
 YV – (s) Yottavolt

YW 
 yW – (s) Yoctowatt
 YW – (s) Yottawatt
 YWCA – (i) Young Women's Christian Association
 YWMV – (i) Your Wallet May Vary (to convey "our budgets are different as far as what is affordable / justifiable")

YY 
 YYH
 (i) YuYu Hakusho
 (s) Taloyoak Airport, IATA airport code
 YYK – (i) Yeah you know

YZ 

Acronyms Y